Francisco Javier Santamaría (September 10, 1886 in Cacaos in Jalapa Municipality, Tabasco – March 1, 1963 in Veracruz, Veracruz) was an influential Mexican writer and politician who is best remembered for his contributions to the study of Mexican literature and lexicography; he variously worked or published as a bibliographer, essayist, geographer, journalist, judge, lawyer, lexicographer, linguist, naturalist, pedagogue, philologist, and poet. He also served as a Senator of the Republic and as Governor of the State of Tabasco.

Life and work
Francisco Javier Santamaría was born in 1886 in the ranchería of Cacaos, to a criollo family of modest means. He began his schooling in Macuspana and completed his studies in Villahermosa (then called San Juan Bautista) at the Instituto Juárez, where he graduated with a teaching degree. He subsequently moved to Mexico City to study law, obtaining his license in 1912.

Beginning at a young age Santamaría demonstrated a talent for composition and an appreciation for the belles-lettres which would eventually evolve into a prolific career as a writer, lexicographer and linguist; his two most often cited works are the Diccionario General de Americanismos and the Diccionario de Mejicanismos, the second of which is a continuation and completion of Joaquín García Icazbalceta's original project.

At the start of his political career Santamaría was an outspoken critic of Plutarco Elías Calles and the Partido Labortista over which he presided. He was also a close friend and political associate of General Francisco R. Serrano (an inveterate enemy of Calles's), and supported the latter's presidential campaign for the 1925-1928 term, an enterprise which would ultimately end in the murderous defeat of Serrano and his closest associates. Santamaría would be the only one on Elías Calles's hit list to not fall the night of October 2, 1927, an event known as the "Huitzilac Massacre," which resulted in the summary executions of Serrano and twenty six other generals, and which President Álvaro Obregón ordered out of fear of military rebellion. His escape and survival would, however, result in years of exile and poverty in the U.S., an account of which he gives in Crónicas del destierro: Desde la ciudad de hierro (Chronicles of Exile: From the Iron City).

After returning to Mexico Santamaría re-entered politics by joining the Institutional Revolutionary Party (PRI); eventually going on to serve as a Senator of the Republic for Tabasco from 1940 to 1946. Immediately after the conclusion of his term he was selected by the party as its candidate for the governorship of Tabasco, competed against three opponents and won handily, reportedly receiving 95% of the votes. As governor he worked to improve his state's educational system and general level of cultural and technological development, while continuing to write books and essays on a variety of subjects.

Francisco Javier Santamaría was a numerary member of the Academia Mexicana de la Lengua and held seat 23.

Published works
(list not comprehensive)

El artículo 91. 1912
El periodismo tabasqueño. 1920
Americanismos y barbarismos. 1921
Ley orgánica de los tribunales del fuero común en el Distrito y territorios federales, con un apéndice que contiene la Ley de jurados, la Ley de licencias a funcionarios públicos y otras disposiciones. 1923
Un valioso hallazgo bibliográfico cervantino: la segunda parte de la edición más discutible de "El quijote". 1926Glosa lexicográfica. 1926Bibliografia general de Tabasco: Tomo I. 1930Crónicas del destierro: Desde la ciudad de hierro. Diario de un desterrado mejicano en Nueva York. Recordaciones del destierro. 1933Nuevo codigo civil para el distrito y territorios federales. 1933Las ruinas occidentales del viejo imperio Maya: en la Sierra del Tortuguero en Macuspana, Tabasco: notas de una excursión. 1933Código de procedimientos civiles para el Distrito Federal y territorios: expedido el 30 de agosto de 1932. 1934Código civil para el Distrito y territorios federales (vigente desde el 1. de octubre de 1932).  1935Diccionario del Código civil para el Distrito y territorios federales. 1935Código civil para el Distrito y territorios federales: expedido en 30 de agosto de 1928 ; exposición de motivos, de la Comisión autora del Proyecto. 1935Ley orgánica del poder judicial de la federación. 1936Datos, materiales i apuntes para la historia del periodismo en Tabasco (1825–1935). 1936Ensayo de crítica del lenguaje. 1941Diccionario General de Americanismos1942El movimiento cultural en Tabasco. 1946El verdadero Grijalva : identificación i rectificación históricas-jeográficas, Centla, Potonchán, Santa María de la Victoria 1949La poesía tabasqueña : antología, semblanzas literarias 1950Documentos históricos de Tabasco. 1950-1951Antología folklórica y musical de Tabasco 1952Diccionario de mejicanismos: razonado; comprobado con citas de autoridades; comparado con el de americanismos y con los vocabularios provinciales de los más distinguidos diccionaristas hispanamericanos. 1959Domingos académicos. 1959

See also
Diccionario de la lengua española de la Real Academia Española
Joaquín Amaro
Marcos E. Becerra
Andrés Bello
Miguel Antonio Caro
Rufino José Cuervo
Rosario María Gutiérrez Eskildsen
María Moliner
Ramón Menéndez Pidal
Meshico

Notes

Bibliography
(English) Camp, Roderic Ai, Mexican political biographies, 1935-1993. The Hague: Mouton, 1993.
(English) Malkiel, Yakov, Linguistics and philology in Spanish America. A survey (1925-1970)''. Austin: University of Texas Press, 1995,

External links
Santamaría in the Tartlton Law Library {en}
Congreso de Tabasco honors Santamaría {es}
Portraits of former governors of Tabasco {es}
Anniversary Diario de la tarde article on Santamaría {es}

Mexican ethnographers
Historians of Mexico
Governors of Tabasco
Writers from Tabasco
Institutional Revolutionary Party politicians
20th-century Mexican historians
20th-century Mexican journalists
Male journalists
Mexican judges
20th-century Mexican lawyers
Mexican legal writers
Linguists from Mexico
Members of the Senate of the Republic (Mexico)
Members of the Mexican Academy of Language
Mexican lexicographers
Philologists
1886 births
1963 deaths
Laborist Party (Mexico) politicians
20th-century male writers
20th-century linguists
20th-century lexicographers
20th-century Mexican politicians
Politicians from Tabasco